Kevin Anderson defeated Jenson Brooksby in the final, 7–6(10–8), 6–4, to win the singles tennis title at the 2021 Hall of Fame Open. It was played on outdoor grass courts and was part of the 250 series of the 2021 ATP Tour. It took place at the International Tennis Hall of Fame in Newport, Rhode Island, United States from 12 to 18 July 2021.

John Isner was the reigning champion from when the tournament was last held in 2019, but chose not to defend his title.

Seeds
The top four seeds receive a bye into the second round.

Draw

Finals

Top half

Bottom half

Qualifying

Seeds

Qualifiers

Qualifying draw

First qualifier

Second qualifier

Third qualifier

Fourth qualifier

References

External links
 Main draw
 Qualifying draw

2021 Singles